Letshego Bank Namibia is a commercial bank in Namibia. It is licensed by the Bank of Namibia, the central bank and national banking regulator.

History
The institution was established in 2002 as Edu Loan Namibia. In August 2008, Letshego Holdings Limited (LHL), a Botswana Stock Exchange (BSE) listed entity, acquired majority shareholding in Edu Loan. The company re-branded to Letshego Financial Services Namibia, to reflect its shareholding. In July 2014, Letshego Namibia was awarded a provisional banking license, which allowed them to make salary loans, with installment loan payments deducted directly from the borrower's paycheck by the employer. In July 2016, the bank was granted a full unrestricted banking licence.

Location
The headquarters of the bank are located at 18 Schwerinsburg Street, in Windhoek, the capital and largest city in Namibia. The bank maintains a total of 15 branches in various urban centers in the country, as at August 2016.

Overview
LBN is 100 percent owned by Letshego Holdings Namibia (LHN). LHN is in turn owned by Letshego Holdings Limited of Botswana (85 percent) and Kumwe Investment Holdings of Namibia (15 percent). The majority owners, based in Gaborone, Botswana, have plans to sell at least 45 percent shareholding to local Namibian shareholders, over the four years 2016 to 2020.

See also
 List of banks in Namibia

References

External links
 Website of Bank of Namibia

Banks of Namibia
Economy of Namibia
Companies based in Windhoek
Banks established in 2002
Namibian companies established in 2002